Squalidus atromaculatus is a species of cyprinid fish endemic to China, Laos, and Vietnam.

References

Squalidus
Taxa named by John Treadwell Nichols
Taxa named by Clifford H. Pope
Fish described in 1927